Acworth is a surname. Notable people with the surname include:

 Bernard Acworth (1885–1963), British writer and creationist
 George Acworth (disambiguation)
 Harry Arbuthnot Acworth, author
 Peter Acworth (born 1970), British pornographer
 William Mitchell Acworth (1850–1925), British railway economist, barrister and politician

References